Roccasicura is a comune (municipality) in the Province of Isernia in the Italian region Molise, located about  northwest of Campobasso and about  north of Isernia.

Roccasicura borders the following municipalities: Carovilli, Forlì del Sannio, Isernia, Miranda, Vastogirardi.

Demographic evolution

References

External links 
 Roccasicura.eu  non official website created by native people on a voluntary basis.

Cities and towns in Molise